Máire Uí Dhroigneáin is an Irish actress and sean-nós singer. She is a native of Spiddal, County Galway, Ireland.

She has played the character Máire in the Irish language drama Ros na Rún since its first broadcast in 1996.

Her other work includes productions with Cumann Dramaíochta Indreabhán, and the part of Phil in the RTÉ Raidió na Gaeltachta drama Baile an Drochid. Her Ros na Rún colleague Joe Steve O Neachtain performs alongside her in the latter.

Uí Dhroigneáin was awarded the Gradam Shean-nós Cois Life in 2004.

In 2006, she was the "Sean-Nós Singer in Residence at the Centre for Irish Studies" of NUI Galway.

References

External links

Actresses from County Galway
Irish television actresses
Living people
Sean-nós singers
Year of birth missing (living people)